Gravy is a type of sauce, usually made from the juices that naturally run from meat or vegetables during cooking.

Gravy may also refer to:

Tomato sauce or ragù, sometimes called "gravy"
Gravy (entertainer), adopted name of dancer Labon Kenneth Blackburn Leeweltine Buckonon Benjamin
Gravy (film), a 2015 horror comedy film
Gravy, a magazine and podcast created by the Southern Foodways Alliance
Gravy (On My Mashed Potatoes), a 1962 Top Ten hit in the U.S., written by Dave Appell and Kal Mann, recorded by Dee Dee Sharp
Gravy, 1968 song by The Monkees, from their album, Head
Lumpy Gravy, a 1968 album by Frank Zappa
 Wavy Gravy, a peace activist and hippie clown associated with The Grateful Dead
 Dave Felton, musician
 Jamal Woolard, rapper and star of the Notorious B.I.G. biopic